Superstar is the debut studio album by Nigerian singer Wizkid. It was released by Empire Mates Entertainment on June 12, 2011. The album's production was handled by Samklef, E-Kelly, Jay Sleek, Shizzi, DJ Klem, Masterkraft, Q-Beats, Banky W and Vebee. It features collaborations with Wande Coal, D'Prince, Banky W and Skales. The album was supported by the singles "Holla at Your Boy", "Tease Me/Bad Guys", "Don't Dull", "Love My Baby", "Pakurumo", and "Oluwa Lo Ni". It is the second best selling album on NotJustOk and was the most highly anticipated Nigerian album of 2011.

Background and composition 
In an interview with Factory78 TV, Wizkid said the album was meant to be released on Valentine's Day, but was postponed due to preparations for a London gig. Superstar incorporates elements of R&B, dancehall and reggae. Although the album is predominantly Afrobeats, the sounds of the aforementioned genres are evident throughout the album, specifically on "Tease Me/Bad Guys", "Gidi Girl" and "Slow Whine". The album's themes deal primarily with starting from the bottom and reaching to the top, i.e. from grass to grace. In "No Lele", Wizkid talks about hustle and how he had to work hard to succeed. In "Say My Name", he talks about his success and how everyone now "calls his name". In "Wad Up", he is reminiscent about the time he used to get insulted by people who called him dirty. In "Shout Out", he thanked everyone who helped him become successful. In a nutshell, Wizkid describes his early life, particularly the hardships he endured and how he triumphant and made a name for himself. Wizkid also made references to God.

Singles
The album's lead single "Holla at Your Boy" was released on January 2, 2010. The accompanying music video for the song was shot at Dowen College in Lekki; Skales and Ice Prince made cameo appearances in the video. The album's second single "Tease Me/Bad Guys" was released on  April 2, 2010. The song's music video was shot and directed by Kemi Adetiba at Aqua Nightclub in Abuja. The album's third single Don't Dull" was released on December 4, 2010; its remix features vocals by Akon and was leaked on October 26, 2011. The album's fourth single "Love My Baby" was released on August 29, 2011. The album's fifth single "Pakurumo" was released on December 10, 2011; its accompanying music video features cameo appearances from Pasuma, Ali Baba, Tee-A, Funke Akindele, Skales, Lynxxx, Davido, Banky W, Pope Da Hitman, Tiwa Savage, Mo'Cheddah and Ice Prince. The music video for the album's sixth single "Oluwa Lo Ni" was released on July 17, 2012; it was shot in 3D by Eban Olivier of Mushroom Productions.

Critical reception

Superstar received generally positive reviews from music critics. Music blog Jaguda.com awarded the album 7 stars out of 10, describing it as "a sound album for an artist who has put out numerous profitable songs". A writer for 360nobs granted the album an overall verdict of 7.5 out of 10, saying it doesn't contain political themes and its lyrical content doesn't border that of the Abami Eda. A Nigerian Entertainment Today writer gave the album 3 stars out of 5, concluding: "On Superstar, Wizkid compressed albums 2 and 3 of his career into one CD. It will be interesting to see which direction the young singer's career takes from here but it's pretty clear to see that Superstar could be the beginning of something very special in Nigerian music."

Accolades
Superstar won Best Album of the Year at the 2012 Nigeria Entertainment Awards. It was nominated for Album of the Year and Best R&B/Pop Album at The Headies 2012.

Track listing

Personnel
Credits adapted from the back cover of Superstar.

 Ayodeji Balogun – primary artist, executive producer, writer, performer
 Olubankole Wellington – executive producer, featured artist, producer, writer
 Segun Demuren – executive producer
 Tunde Demuren – assistant executive producer, A&R
 Stanley "Tino Benbel" Ekuro – assistant executive producer, A&R
 Raoul John Njeng-Njeng – featured artist, writer
 Charles Enebeli – featured artist, writer
 Oluwatobi Wande Ojosipe – featured artist, writer
 Samklef – producer 
 E-Kelly – producer
 Jay Sleek – producer
 Sheyi Akerele – producer
 DJ Klem – producer
 Sunny (Masterkraft) Nweke – producer
 Q-Beats – producer
 Vebee – producer
 Foster Zeeno – mixed, mastering
 Brexx Bitaseme – recording engineer
 Osagie Osarenkhoe – management 
 Seyi Charles George – photography
 Osa Seven – album artwork
 Uba Pacific – marketer, distributor

Release history

References

External links

2011 debut albums
Albums produced by Masterkraft (producer)
Albums produced by Samklef
Wizkid albums
Yoruba-language albums
Albums produced by Shizzi
Albums produced by Jay Sleek
2011 in Nigerian music